This is a list of notable musical artists who have been referred to or have had their music described as post-hardcore.

Post-hardcore is a punk rock music genre that maintains the aggression and intensity of hardcore punk but emphasizes a greater degree of creative expression initially inspired by post-punk and noise rock. The genre took shape in the mid- to late 1980s with releases by bands from cities that had established hardcore scenes, such as Fugazi from Washington, D.C., as well as groups such as Big Black and Jawbox that stuck closer to post-hardcore's noise rock roots.

List

0–9
 36 Crazyfists
 9mm Parabellum Bullet

A

 A Day to Remember
 Adept
 AFI
 Aiden
 Akissforjersey
 Alesana
 Alexisonfire
 Alive Like Me
 American Standards
 The Amity Affliction
 Anatomy of a Ghost
 ...And You Will Know Us by the Trail of Dead
 Annisokay
 The Appleseed Cast
 The Armed
 Armor for Sleep
 As Cities Burn
 Asking Alexandria
 At the Drive-In
Atreyu
 Attack Attack!
 AWS

B

 Balance and Composure
 Bastro
 Bear vs. Shark
 Bedlight for Blue Eyes
 Before Their Eyes
 Being as an Ocean
 Beloved
 Biffy Clyro
 Big Black
 Billy Talent
 Birds in Row
 Bitch Magnet
 Black Eyes
 Black Veil Brides
 The Blackout
 The Bled
 Blessthefall
 Blindside
 The Blood Brothers
 Bluetip
 Box Car Racer
 Boys Night Out
 BoySetsFire
 Brand New
 Bring Me the Horizon
 Bullet for My Valentine
 The Bunny the Bear
 Burden of a Day
 Burning Airlines
 Bury Tomorrow

C

 Cap'n Jazz
 The Casket Lottery
 Cave In
 The Chariot
 Chasing Victory
 Chavez
 Chiodos
 Chunk! No, Captain Chunk!
 Circa Survive
 Circle Takes The Square
 Circus Lupus
 City of Caterpillar
 Classic Case
 Cloud Nothings 
 Code Orange
 Coheed and Cambria
 Coldrain
 The Color Morale
 Confide
 Converge
 Crown the Empire
 The Crownhate Ruin
 Cry of the Afflicted
 Cursive

D

 Dance Club Massacre
 Dance Gavin Dance
 Dayshell
 Dead and Divine
 Dealing With Damage
 Dead Poetic
 Deaf Havana
 Deftones
 Destroy Rebuild Until God Shows
 Devil Sold His Soul
 The Devil Wears Prada
 Disco Ensemble
 The Dismemberment Plan
 Dizmas
 Dogleg
 Dream On, Dreamer
 Dream State
 Drive Like Jehu
 Drop Dead, Gorgeous
 Drug Church

E

 Eat Me Raw
 Edison Glass
 The Effigies
 Egg Hunt
 Emarosa
 Embrace
 Emery
 Engine Down
 Enter Shikari
 Envy
 Envy on the Coast
 Escape the Fate
 Every Time I Die
 Everyone Dies in Utah
 Eyes Set to Kill

F

 The Fall of Troy
 Falling in Reverse
 Famous Last Words
 Far
 Faraquet
 Fear Before
 The Felix Culpa
 Fever 333
 Fiddlehead
 Fighting with Wire
 Fightstar
 Finch
 Fireside
 Fjørt
 Flee the Seen
 Flyleaf
 For All Those Sleeping
 Four Letter Lie
 Four Year Strong
 Framing Hanley
 Frodus
 From Autumn to Ashes
 From First to Last
 Fugazi
 Funeral for a Friend

G

 Garden Variety
 Gatherers
 The Getaway Plan
 Get Scared
 Girls Against Boys
 Glamour of the Kill
 Glasseater
 Glassjaw
 Grade
 Greeley Estates

H

 Hail the Sun
 Hands Like Houses
 Handsome
 Hawthorne Heights
 He Is Legend
 Heaven in Her Arms
 Hell Is for Heroes
 Helmet
 Hidden in Plain View
 Holding Absence
 Hoover
 Hopes Die Last
 Hopesfall
 Hot Snakes
 Hot Water Music
 Hundred Reasons

I

 I Am Empire
 I Am Ghost
 I Am the Avalanche
 I Prevail
 I See Stars
 I Set My Friends on Fire
 I the Mighty
 Icarus the Owl
 Ice Nine Kills
 Idiot Pilot
 In Fear and Faith
 Inhale Exhale
 Isles & Glaciers

J

 Jamie's Elsewhere
 Jawbox
 The Jesus Lizard
 The Jonbenét
 June of 44
 Just Surrender

K

 Karate
 Karate High School
 Karp
 The Kinison
 Knapsack

L

 La Dispute
 Leathermouth
 Letlive.
 Ling tosite Sigure
 A Lot Like Birds
 Lovehatehero
 Lower Than Atlantis
 Lower Definition
 Lungfish

M

 Madina Lake
 Majority Rule
 Mallory Knox
 Mclusky
 Means
 Memphis May Fire
 The Men
 MewithoutYou
 Milemarker
 Million Dead
 Misery Signals
 Mohinder
 Moneen
 Monty Are I
 Moss Icon
 Movements
 My Chemical Romance
 My Epic
 My First Story
 My Ticket Home

N

 Naked Raygun
 The Nation of Ulysses
 Neurosis
 Nomeansno
 Norma Jean

O

 Oathbreaker
 Oceana
 Of Mice & Men
 Old Gray
 On the Last Day
 On the Might of Princes
 One Ok Rock
 Open Hand
 Orange 9mm
 Orchid
 Our Last Night
 Outline in Color

P

 Palisades
 Petrol Girls
 Pg.99
 Pianos Become the Teeth
 Picture Me Broken
 Pierce the Veil
 Pile
 Planes Mistaken for Stars
 The Plot to Blow Up the Eiffel Tower
 Poison the Well
 Polar Bear Club
 Project 86
 Protest the Hero
 Pulled Apart by Horses
 Pvris

Q

 Q and Not U
 Quicksand

R

 Rapeman
 The Receiving End of Sirens
 The Red Jumpsuit Apparatus
 Refused
 Rites of Spring
 Rival Schools
 Rodan
 Rollins Band
 Rolo Tomassi
 Rosaline
 Rye Coalition

S

 Saccharine Trust
 Sainthood Reps
 Saosin
 Scary Kids Scaring Kids
 Scratch Acid
 Seahaven
 Secret and Whisper
 Secrets
 Self Defense Family
 Senses Fail
 Sent by Ravens
 Shellac
 Shiner
 Showbread
 Shudder to Think
 Silverstein
 Six Finger Satellite
 Sky Eats Airplane
 A Skylit Drive
 Sleeping with Sirens
 Slint
 Small Brown Bike
 Smart Went Crazy
 Soulside
 The Sound of Animals Fighting
 Sparta
 Standstill
 State Faults
 Static Dress
 A Static Lullaby
 Story of the Year
 Stutterfly
 Sunny Day Real Estate
 Svalbard
 Swing Kids
 Sworn In

T

 Taking Back Sunday
 Tera Melos
 Texas Is the Reason
 These Arms Are Snakes
 These Hearts
 Thousand Below 
 Thrice
 Thursday
 Tides of Man
 Tiny Moving Parts
 Title Fight
 Too Close to Touch
 Touché Amoré
 Trenchmouth
 Trophy Scars

U

 Underoath
 Universal Order of Armageddon
 Unsane
 Unwound'''
 The Used

V

 Vampires Everywhere!
 The Van Pelt
 Vanna
 Vaux
 Vendetta Red
 The Venetia Fair
 Versa
 The VSS

W

 Wage War
 Wargasm
 The Warmers
 We Are the Ocean
 We Came as Romans
 Wolf & Bear
 Wolves at the Gate
 The Word Alive

X

Y

 Yashin
 Yesterdays Rising
 YouInSeries
 Young Guns
 Young Widows
 Yourcodenameis:milo

Z

See also
 List of emo artists
 List of metalcore bands
 List of post-punk bands
 List of punk bands: 0–K, L–Z
 List of screamo bands

References

 
Lists of hardcore punk bands